La Marina is a coastal village administered by the city of Elche, in the province of Alicante on Spain's Costa Blanca. Nearby inland is a large urbanisation built from the mid-1980s onwards confusingly also called La Marina: more correctly called Urbanisation La Marina. The village is on the Costa Azul bus route providing access northwards to Alicante and southbound to Torrevieja and ultimately Cartagena.

La Marina is a district in the municipality of Elche, province of Alicante. It is located by the Mediterranean sea, by the mountain range of Sierra del Molar, very close to Guardamar del Segura and by the salt pans (Salinas) of Santa Pola. The 1'5 km long beach receives the same name. The main access to La Marina is through national road N-332.

Geography 
La Marina has non-urban beaches, systems of dunes and large pine woods. The main beach (Las Pesqueras) is over 1100 metres long, although it continues towards the south and is connected to the Tusales beach of Guardamar del Segura.

History 
The history of La Marina is very influenced by the disappearance of the San Francisco de Asís village in Sierra del Molar mountain range, as it was after the abandonment of the settlement when La Marina started to constitute a town.

Demography 
La Marina has 2.093 inhabitants (INE 2009). La Marina has presented a rapid demographic growth in the past years. For example, its population increased by 48% between 2000 and 2006.

Economy 
Once orientated towards fishing and agriculture, nowadays the local economy develops around sustainable tourism due to a restrictive measurement related to uncontrolled urban development. La Marina has a 'Great Comfort' international camping/resort of great quality towards which most tourists are attracted. As for local tourism, the beach awarded with the blue flag is the main resource, as well as two hotels and numerous restaurants in the town centre.

The ""San Francisco de Asís"" church was built at the late 19th Century, as the ancient chapel which was built short after the disappearance of the San Francisco de Asís settlement was too small. During the Spanish Civil War it was looted and turned into a barrack after being briefly restored. It is a relatively small church consisting of one main nave and a chapel to each side. At the presbytery stands a ceramic altar in which the image of Crucified Christ can be seen, as well as a niche to each side with the images of the patron saints San Francisco de Asís and the Rosary Virgin.

Holidays 
The holidays in La Marina to honour its patron saints are held in late September and early October. 
During the holidays, acts such as the charanga (a parade), the sopar del carabasset, the procession, the mascletà and the fireworks take place to honour of San Francisco de Asís and the Rosary Virgin.

Beaches 

The main beach of the district is La Marina beach, a beautiful and large beach of thin and golden sand. It is considered semi-urban as a small part of it has particular households behind it, but mostly there is a large pine wood. It has a blue flag, maritime surveillance and a rent service of deckchairs and parasols. There is also a nautical station in order to practice water sports.
 
The Pinet beach is a few metres north La Marina and reflects a much more traditional aspect with small households, restaurants and two hostels all of which are located directly on the beach.

References

External links 
 Playa de La Marina, en la página oficial de Turismo de Elche

Municipalities in the Province of Alicante